Ahasver is a 1981 German-language novel by Stefan Heym. It was published in English as The Wandering Jew in 1984.

References

1981 German novels